Gunvald is a given name. Notable people with the name include:

Gunvald Aus (1851–1950), Norwegian-American engineer
Gunvald Bøe (1903–1967), Norwegian archivist and historian
Gunvald Engelstad (1900–1972), Norwegian politician for the Labour Party
Gunvald Ludvigsen (born 1949), Norwegian politician for the Liberal Party
Gunvald Strøm-Walseng (1889–1951), Norwegian barrister
Gunvald Tomstad (1918–1970), major agent of the British SIS, Norwegian resistance member during World War II

See also
Kunvald